Nordio is an Italian surname. Notable people with the surname include:

Domenico Nordio (born 1971), Italian violinist 
Furio Nordio, Italian bobsledder who competed in the early 1960s
Roberto Nordio (born 1958), Italian Air Force officer
Tito Nordio (1908–1959), Italian sailor at the 1928 Summer Olympics in Amsterdam

Italian-language surnames